Georgi Olegovich Bugulov (born 17 March 1993) is a Russian professional football player who plays for Caspiy.

External links
 
 
 

1993 births
Sportspeople from Vladikavkaz
Living people
Russian footballers
Association football midfielders
FC Spartak Vladikavkaz players
Speranța Nisporeni players
FC Metalurgi Rustavi players
FC KAMAZ Naberezhnye Chelny players
FC Slavia Mozyr players
FC Caspiy players
Moldovan Super Liga players
Russian expatriate footballers
Expatriate footballers in Moldova
Expatriate footballers in Georgia (country)
Expatriate footballers in Belarus
Expatriate footballers in Kazakhstan